Doodia maxima (synonym Blechnum maximum), also known as the giant rasp fern, occurs in moist open forests in eastern Australia. It was considered to be a natural hybrid. Some sources place the species in the genus Blechnum, others, including the Pteridophyte Phylogeny Group classification of 2016 (PPG I), place it in Doodia.

References

Blechnaceae
Flora of New South Wales
Flora of Queensland
Plants described in 2011